Saliha Abid Hussain (1913 - 1988) was an Indian writer of Urdu literature, considered by many to be one of the prominent writers of modern Urdu novels and children's literature. She is the author of works such as Azra, Rekhta, Yadgaray hali Baat Cheet and Jane Walon ki Yad Ati Hai. The Government of India awarded her the fourth highest Indian civilian honour of Padma Shri in 1983. Her life has been documented in a biography, Saliha Abid Hussain, written by Sughra Mehdi and published in 1993.

Her writing covered many subjects, including women's rights, and according to her niece Dr Sayeda Hameed, who curated the exhibition Pathbreakers: The 20th Century Muslim Women of India at the Bangalore International Centre in 2020, "She spoke out against Triple Talaq and other subjects fearlessly."

See also

 Urdu literature

References

Recipients of the Padma Shri in literature & education
Indian women novelists
Urdu-language writers from India
Indian women children's writers
Indian children's writers
20th-century Indian novelists
20th-century Indian women writers
Women writers from Delhi
20th-century Indian Muslims
Novelists from Delhi
People from Panipat
1988 deaths
1913 births